Jessica Stenson (née Trengove; born 15 August 1987) is an Australian athlete who won the gold medal in the marathon at the 2022 Commonwealth Games in Birmingham. As a long-distance runner, she competes in distances from 5000 metres up to the marathon. She represented Australia at the 2012 London Olympics and 2016 Rio de Janeiro Olympics in the marathon.

Background
Nicknamed Trenny, Trengove was born on 15 August 1987 in Naracoorte, South Australia. She attended Naracoorte Primary School before going to Naracoorte High School and boarding school Annesley College, having moved to Adelaide to attend the school at the start of year 10. She attended the University of South Australia from 2006 to 2009 where she earned a Bachelor of Physiotherapy. She participated in wrestling from the age of nine to the age of twenty-one.  She played netball for Contax in 2008. She also played basketball, competing in the South Australia 12–19 State Country U18s. , she lives in Adelaide where she is a physiotherapist, and pilates instructor. Her brother is former Port Adelaide Football Club player Jack Trengove, and has been influential in her running career by creating a sense of competition in her family. The family competition also included Trengove's sister Abbie, who represented their state in wrestling.

Stenson is an ambassador for The Little Heroes Foundation, Jodi Lee Foundation and Bupa.

Athletics
Stenson's running career started when she was in primary school, where she ran south east cross country. In 2000, she was selected for the South Australia representative cross country team. , she was coached by Adam Didyk, prior to that was coached by Roger Pedrick.

Stenson competed in the City to Bay Run in 2010, finishing first. That year, she also competed at the Nanning, China hosted World Half Marathon Championships. She ran her first marathon in March 2012, where she set an Olympic A qualifying time of 2 hours, 31 minutes. In 2012, her training regime included running up to  a week. On her light training days, she ran . Trengove was selected to represent Australia at the 2012 Summer Olympics in the women's marathon. She was the third South Australian athletics competitor to qualify for the Games, and prepared for them by training in Adelaide. She finished the Olympic marathon in 39th place with a time of 2:31:17, 8 minutes and 10 seconds behind the first-place finisher Tiki Gelana. At the 2014 Commonwealth Games, she won the bronze medal, running a then personal best of 2:30:12.  She came 22nd in the same event at the 2016 Rio de Janeiro Olympics in a time of 2:31:44. She finished ninth in the 2017 IAAF World Championships marathon in a time of 2:28:59. This was the best performance by an Australian woman in a World Championship.

Personal bests
As of January 2019, her personal best times are:
Long Jump: 3.68m, Adelaide, 1998
1,500 metres: 4:26.9, Adelaide, 2013.
5,000 metres: 15:35, Adelaide, November 2016.
10,000 metres: 32:17, Stanford, April 2015.
 half marathon: 1:10:59, Japan, February 2018.
 marathon: 2:25:13, Perth, 17 October 2021.

Results
Her results include:
 Gold Medal [1st, 2:27:31], 2022 Birmingham Commonwealth Games Marathon
1st, 2:27:45, 2015 Melbourne Marathon
24th, 1:14:21, IAAF / SINOPEC World Half Marathon Championships, Nanning, 16 October 2010
14th, Nagoya International Women's Marathon, Nagoya, 11 March 2012
71st, IAAF World Cross Country Championships, Punta Umbría, 20 March 2011
Winner, 2011 City2Surf, Sydney, 2011

Recognition

 2016 - People's Choice Award at the Advertiser/Channel 7 Sport Star of the Year awards. 
 October 2022 - Awarded the Australian Sports Medal for her achievements at the Commonwealth Games.
 2022 - Australian Institute of Sport Female Athlete of The Year

References

External links
 
 
 
 
 
 

1987 births
Living people
Sportswomen from South Australia
Athletes from Adelaide
Australian female long-distance runners
Australian female marathon runners
Olympic athletes of Australia
Athletes (track and field) at the 2012 Summer Olympics
Athletes (track and field) at the 2016 Summer Olympics
Commonwealth Games bronze medallists for Australia
Commonwealth Games medallists in athletics
Athletes (track and field) at the 2014 Commonwealth Games
Athletes (track and field) at the 2018 Commonwealth Games
World Athletics Championships athletes for Australia
Australian netball players
Netball players from South Australia
Contax Netball Club players
21st-century Australian women
Medallists at the 2014 Commonwealth Games
Medallists at the 2018 Commonwealth Games
Medallists at the 2022 Commonwealth Games